Ancula gibbosa, common name Atlantic ancula, is a species of dorid nudibranch. It is a marine gastropod mollusc in the family Goniodorididae.

Distribution
This species was described from the Mediterranean Sea at Nice, France. It has a wide distribution from there along the Atlantic coast to Norway, Greenland, Iceland and across to New England on the coast of North America. Ancula pacifica apparently has a number of colour varieties which closely approach this species and is currently believed to be a synonym.

Description
This goniodorid nudibranch has a translucent white body with yellow or white tipped processes.

Ecology
Ancula gibbosa feeds on Ectoprocta. It has been reported to possibly feed on a variety of sessile organisms, but these are just the substratum to which the ectoprocts are attached.

References

Goniodorididae
Gastropods described in 1818